Carroll Coates (born 23 September 1929 in Old Bridge, Huntingdon, England) is a songwriter, composer and lyricist whose works have been produced commercially from the 1950s to the 1990s. His songs have been recorded by Frank Sinatra, Carmen McRae, Tony Bennett, Sarah Vaughan, Shirley Horn, Mel Tormé, Nancy Wilson and others. His jazz ballad "You'll See" has been recorded by more than a dozen artists. Coates has written at least nine songs for film, including Sunday in New York.

Biography
In 1996, he reportedly lived in the San Francisco Bay Area.

Following Sarah Vaughan's death in April 1990, Coates composed a song in tribute to her, called "Sarah". In a tribute concert for Sarah Vaughan on 25 June 1991, the Shirley Horn Trio performed "Sarah". Reviewing the concert, The New York Times reported:

Carroll Coates's affectionate tribute...praises Vaughan as one who "could do more with a melody than a hip whippoorwill." The final verse imagines Vaughan in heaven, in a quartet with Billie Holiday, Dinah Washington and Bessie Smith, where instead of squabbling over roles she says to Smith, "I'm new here, you lead."

On 28 April 1996, Coates was honoured in a concert called "Songfest: A Songwriters Celebration", held in Larkspur, California. Before the event, the San Francisco Chronicle reported that "Coates will introduce the vocalists who will sing his songs, among them Rebecca Parris, Faith Winthrop, Shanna Carlson, Buddy Conner and Amy Dondy."

Works

Work for film

Audio Recordings

Awards 
Along with co-writers Peter Nero and Roland Everett, Coates was nominated for a Golden Globe Award in 1964 for composing the song "Sunday in New York" for the film of the same name.

References

External links 
 

1929 births
English film score composers
English male film score composers
English lyricists
English songwriters
Jazz songwriters
Living people
British male jazz musicians
British male songwriters